Jeremy Dier (born 30 May 1960) is a British former professional tennis player. He is the father of footballer Eric Dier.

Born in Brighton, Dier competed on the professional tour from the late 1970s to early 1980s, reaching a best singles world ranking of 344. Most active in doubles, he featured in the Wimbledon main draw seven times in men's doubles and four times in mixed doubles. He and Jeremy Bates partnered together to beat the 16th-seeded pairing of Jan Gunnarsson and Mike Leach in the first round of the 1983 Wimbledon Championships.

ATP Challenger finals

Doubles: 1 (0–1)

References

External links
 
 

1960 births
Living people
British male tennis players
English male tennis players
Tennis people from East Sussex
Sportspeople from Brighton
20th-century British people
21st-century British people